Rafi ibn Abd al-Latif ibn Talfah (born in 1954 in Tikrit) was the last head of the Iraqi Directorate of General Security secret police force at the end of President Saddam Hussein's reign. A maternal cousin of Saddam, Rafi went into hiding during the Iraq War, when a United States-led Coalition invaded the country and overthrew Hussein's government. A key aide to general al-Douri, Rafi al-Tikriti provided information and actionable intelligence on antiregime individuals and opposition groups in each governorate of Iraq, particularly Kurdish, Iranian, and Turkmen.

Career
Rafi was the jack of hearts in the most-wanted Iraqi playing cards developed by the U.S. Defense Intelligence Agency during the war in Iraq. He is currently still at large.

In 2018, Iraqi authorities published a list of the 60 most-wanted people, among them Rafi.

References

RAFI ABD-AL-LATIF TILFAH AL-TIKRITI | United Nations Security Council 

1954 births
Living people
People from Tikrit
Iraqi military personnel

Tulfah family
Most-wanted Iraqi playing cards
20th-century Iraqi politicians
21st-century Iraqi politicians
Arab Socialist Ba'ath Party – Iraq Region politicians